The Cebu Exchange is an office skyscraper in Cebu City, Philippines.

Construction
In 2015, property developer Arthaland acquired the  lot where the building would stand, located along Salinas Drive near Cebu IT Park, and construction started in 2018. Topped-out in 2020, it was completed in 2022. It is meant to host offices of businesses involved in the information technology and business process outsourcing industries.

Certification
Designed as a green building, the Cebu Exchange has received various certifications including the EDGE Zero Carbon certification in 2018, as well as the LEED Platinum and BERDE 5-star certifications. It was the first building in the world to receive a EDGE Zero Carbon certification.

References

Buildings and structures in Cebu City
Office buildings in the Philippines